TV Novel: Eunhui, or Eun-hee, is a 2013 South Korean morning soap opera starring Kyung Soo-jin, Lee In, Choi Yoon-so and Jung Mi-jin. It aired on KBS2 from June 24, 2013 to January 3, 2014 on Mondays to Fridays at 9:00 a.m. for 140 episodes.

Plot
A day before the Korean War breaks out in 1950, a man is murdered. This event triggers repercussions in three families, as four young people struggle with love and forgiveness.

Kim Eun-hee's father was falsely accused of the murder, and dies tragically as a result. Since then, Eun-hee has been shunned by her fellow villagers.

Im Sung-jae has always been in love with Eun-hee, but the past threatens to tear them apart. Since his father's death, Sung-jae was ironically rescued and raised as a son by the real killer, Cha Seok-goo.

Seok-goo's daughter, Cha Young-joo, is arrogant and smart, and has feelings for Sung-jae. Her jealousy drives her to try to break up his relationship with Eun-hee.

Choi Jung-tae is also in love with Eun-hee, but he accepts that she cares for someone else.

Cast

Main characters
Kyung Soo-jin as Kim Eun-hee
Lee In as Im Sung-jae
Jung Yoo-geun as young Sung-jae
Choi Yoon-so as Cha Young-joo
Jung Min-jin as Choi Jung-tae

Supporting characters
Lee Dae-yeon as Kim Hyung-man
Kim Hyeseon as Han Jung-ok
Hong Il-kwon as Im Deok-soo
Ban Hyo-jung as Lee Geum-soon
Choi Joon-yong as Lee Baek-soo
Jung So-hee as Shin Haeng-ja
Park Chan-hwan as Cha Seok-goo
Hwang Mi-seon as Kang Gil-rye
Choi Joo-bong as Captain Go
Chae Min-hee as Go Soon-deok
Son Jong-bum as Hong Sam-bong
Kim Bo-mi as Kim Hyung-sook / Lola Kim
Lee Ha-yool as Choi Myung-ho
Jo Byung-ki as Kang Jae-pil
Kang Kyung-hun as Madam Jung
Kim Min-kyung as Mi-kyung
Ban Sang-yoon as Nub-chi
Lee In-chul as President Shin
Im Ji-young as Miss Park
Kim Tae-rin as Jung-sook
Yoo Jae-hyun as Yang Ah Chi
Seo Hye-jin as Miss Go
Choi Ro-woon as Seung-mo

Awards and nominations

References

External links
TV Novel: Eunhui official KBS website 
TV Novel: Eunhui at KBS World

2013 South Korean television series debuts
2014 South Korean television series endings
Korean Broadcasting System television dramas
Korean-language television shows
South Korean romance television series
South Korean melodrama television series